Don Allan Figueroa is a Filipino American comic book artist and toy designer. He is best known for his work on many different Transformers designs, for both the defunct Dreamwave Productions and with IDW Publishing.

Dreamwave Productions
One of Figueroa's projects was to illustrate Dreamwave's first Transformers: The War Within miniseries.  In the series, Figueroa was tasked to design new alternate modes for the Generation 1 Transformers, based on the fact that the series is set long before their arrival on Earth. The Transformers: Titanium line of die-cast toys was based on this series.

Figueroa was later brought on to pencil the "Worlds Collide" story arc on the Transformers: Armada comic book series, which featured some G1 Decepticons. He was eventually named as the penciler for the ongoing Generation 1 comic. He also contributed heavily to their More Than Meets the Eye eight-issue volume of character profiles.

IDW Publishing
After Dreamwave went out of business, Figueroa was brought into IDW Publishing's Transformers franchise. At IDW, he worked on Beast Wars: The Gathering, The Transformers: Stormbringer, a comic adaptation of 1986's The Transformers: The Movie, the official 2007 Transformers movie prequel and a Spotlight issue on Optimus Prime.  His later work included Beast Wars: The Ascending, a Target exclusive movie prequel comic with Andrew Wildman as well as many of the profiles for the Transformers: Beast Wars Sourcebook profile series.

For a time, Figueroa stopped working on the Transformers comics to pursue other projects, the first of which being a five-part series for IDW titled Zombies: Hunters. He returned to Transformers as a fill-in artist on the third issue of Transformers: Defiance, a prequel to Transformers: Revenge of the Fallen. He also provided line art on the first story in All Hail Megatron: Coda, as well as the Terminator Salvation prequel comic.

Figueroa returned to Transformers full-time as the artist of IDW's ongoing Transformers series.

Toy designs

Figueroa worked with Hasbro on their Transformers: Titanium line of die-cast toys. Figueroa based several designs after his War Within series for Dreamwave, but did not limit himself to those. All-in-all, he created the designs for every six-inch transforming figure in the line, over 12 figures, not including repaints.

After the Titanium line ended, Figueroa worked with Hasbro again on their Transformers: Classics toy-line, creating updated, highly articulated designs for classic Transformers characters. The line has since expanded into the Transformers: Universe line, and continues to put out new toys.

References

 Don Figueroa on deviantART

Living people
1964 births
American comics artists
American artists of Filipino descent
Toy designers
Filipino comics artists